Michael Conway Baker (born March 13, 1937) is a Canadian composer and music educator of American birth. He became a naturalized Canadian citizen in 1970 and has lived more or less continuously in the Vancouver area since.

Life and career
Baker was born in West Palm Beach, Florida. After self-teaching basic music theory as a child, Baker moved to Vancouver, British Columbia in 1958 at which time he began formal piano studies.  Subsequently, Baker studied music at the University of British Columbia where he was a pupil in music composition with teachers Jean Coulthard and Elliot Weisgarber. After graduating with a Bachelor of Music degree in 1966, he eventually pursued graduate studies at Western Washington University where he earned a Masters of Music in 1972.

Baker has composed numerous scores for film, television and has over 150 concert works to his credit for which he has received many awards.  Included in his awards are three Genie Awards (The Grey Fox 1983 and John and the Missus 1987), one Juno Award for Classical Composition of the Year (Concerto For Piano and Chamber Orchestra, 1992) and an ACTRA Award for best score for a TV Series (David Suzuki's A Planet for the Taking).  He has composed for the National Ballet of Canada, Fanfare to Expo '86 in Vancouver, many feature films and TV series including several episodes of Road to Avonlea.  In 1997, Baker was awarded the Order of British Columbia.    Michael Conway Baker was inducted into the British Columbia Entertainment Hall of Fame in November, 2006 with a star on the sidewalk in Vancouver, BC just like his father, comedian Phil Baker has on the sidewalk in Hollywood, CA.

Within the Canadian music circles, he is somewhat well known for having composed Vancouver Variations, used as the theme music for the CBC Radio 2 morning request program Here's to You. Internationally, his music is known for Dorothy Hamill's Ice Capades full length ice-ballet Cinderella: Frozen in Time which toured North America and China for 5 years. Besides that highly popular soundtrack album, he has seven albums entirely of his music as well as having works on many other cds.

Michael Conway Baker spent seventeen years as an elementary school teacher and currently lives in North Vancouver. His wife Penny Anne Baker, manager and lyricist, passed in 2017.

References

External links
  Michael Conway Baker official site
 Society of Composers, Authors and Music Publishers of Canada

1937 births
Living people
Canadian film score composers
University of British Columbia School of Music alumni
Juno Award for Classical Composition of the Year winners
Canadian classical composers
Canadian television composers
Best Original Score Genie and Canadian Screen Award winners
Summit Records artists